Konjyosom Rural Municipality is a Rural Municipality in Lalitpur District in Bagmati Province of Nepal that was established in 2017 by merging the former Village development committees Sankhu, Dalchoki, Chaughare, Nallu and Bhardev.The center of this rural municipality is located at Chaughare. The major ethnic group of this rural municipality are Tamang. The name Konjyosom itself means Gautama Buddha in Tamang language.

Demographics
At the time of the 2011 Nepal census, Konjyosom Rural Municipality had a population of 9,709. Of these, 75.0% spoke Tamang, 21.5% Nepali, 1.5% Magar, 1.3% Pahari, 0.2% Newar and 0.5% other languages as their first language.

In terms of ethnicity/caste, 75.8% were Tamang, 13.9% Hill Brahmin, 2.8% Chhetri, 2.3% Magar, 2.2% Newar, 1.4% Pahari, 0.7% Kami, 0.1% Sunuwar and 0.8% others.

In terms of religion, 63.4% were Buddhist, 34.6% Hindu, 1.8% Christian and 0.2% others.

References

Rural municipalities in Lalitpur District, Nepal
Rural municipalities of Nepal established in 2017